Tetje Mierendorf (born April 18, 1972 in Hamburg) is a German comedian, musical theatre, and voice actor.

Biography 

After his Abitur he completed an apprenticeship as bank teller. In 2004, he played the leading part of the German adaption of My Big Fat Obnoxious Fiance. Later he was a permanent member of the ensemble of the improv comedy show Schillerstraße. In December 2005, he played the role of the elephant seal "Seele-Fant" in the TV-adaption of the children's book Urmal From the Ice Age from German writer Max Kruse. His most important musical theatre roles were "The Big Bopper" in the German production of Buddy – The Buddy Holly Story and "Edna Turnblad" in the German production of the musical Hairspray.

Theatre engagements (choosing) 
 April 1995 to February 1997, Imperial Theater Hamburg, Grease, role: Vince Fontaine/Teen Angel
 December 1999 to April 2000, Imperial Theater Hamburg, The Rocky Horror Show, role: Eddie/Dr. Scott
 April 1997 to April 2001, Theater im Hafen Hamburg, Buddy - The Buddy Holly Story, role: The Big Bopper
 2003 to 2004, Improvisational theatre Springmaus. Tour.
 März 2005 to August 2005, Schmidts Tivoli Hamburg, "XXLvis"
 May 30, 2006, to June 11, 2006, Schmidt-Theater Hamburg, "Emmi – Die Salomé vom Spielbudenplatz oder Sing, wenn du kannst" (Emmi- The Salomé of Spielbudenplatz or sing if you can)
 December 2009 to September 2010, Musical Dome Cologne, Hairspray, role: Edna Turnblad (alternate first cast).
 as from December 2, 2010, Operettenhaus Hamburg, Sister Act, role: Bones

References

External links

 (German)
Actors page at the "Deutsche Synchronkartei" (German Voice Actor Register) (German)

1972 births
Living people
German male comedians
German male musical theatre actors
German male voice actors
21st-century German male singers
Male actors from Hamburg